Munith is an unincorporated community in northeast Jackson County in the U.S. state of Michigan.

The ZIP Code is 49259 and serves portions of both Henrietta and Waterloo townships.

In addition to the post office, there is a township hall, a cemetery, a gas station/convenience store, the headquarters of Farmers State Bank (member FDIC and an equal housing lender), and zero stoplights. The Munith area is served by the Stockbridge Community Schools, Northwest Community Schools, and East Jackson Community Schools.  The community is home to two Christian congregations: Munith United Methodist Church on Main Street  and Jeruel Baptist Church on M-106.

References 

Unincorporated communities in Jackson County, Michigan
Unincorporated communities in Michigan